Baird's trogon (Trogon bairdii) is a species of bird belonging to the family Trogonidae, the quetzals and trogons. It is found in Costa Rica and Panama. Its name commemorates Spencer Fullerton Baird, a 19th-century naturalist and first curator of the Smithsonian Institution.

Taxonomy and systematics

Baird's trogon is sometimes treated as conspecific with one or both of green-backed trogon (T. viridis) and white-tailed trogon (T. chionurus). They do form a sister group with black-headed trogon (T. melanocephalus) and citreoline trogon (T. citreolus). Baird's trogon is monotypic.

Description

The male's head and most of the breast are bluish black and the rest of the underparts a rich bright red. It has a stout light blue bill and ring around the eye. The upperparts are metallic blue-green and the wings mostly blackish with some white on the primary feathers. The upper side of the tail feathers are greenish- to violet-blue with black tips. Their underside is white with black tips. The female replaces the blue and green with dark slate above and a paler gray in the throat and breast. The underparts have less red and the underside of the tail is barred with black and white.

Distribution and habitat

Baird's trogon is found on the Pacific slope of Costa Rica from approximately the Tárcoles River south just into western Panama's Chiriquí Province. It primarily inhabits the interior canopy of humid rainforest but also occurs at its edges, in tall secondary forest, and in shady semi-open woodland.

Behavior

Feeding

Baird's trogon forages by sallying to take fruits and insects from foliage and will also take prey from the ground. Small vertebrates are a minor part of its diet.

Breeding

Baird's trogon breeds between April and August. They nest in a cavity in the decaying trunk of a dead tree. The clutch size is two to three eggs; incubation takes 16 to 17 days, and fledging takes about 25 days from hatching.

Vocalization

The song of Baird's trogon is a "series of barking notes, first level, then accelerating and falling abruptly, sometimes terminating with several widely spaced notes on [a] lower pitch". It also makes a "sharp cackle" when bothered.

Status

The IUCN originally assessed Baird's trogon in 1988 as Threatened, but since 2004 has rated it Near Threatened. It has a small range and is losing habitat to deforestation. It is mostly restricted to protected areas in Costa Rica and is rare in Panama, with few records in the 2000s.

References

External links

Baird's Trogon by monarchzman

Baird's trogon
Birds of Costa Rica
Baird's trogon
Taxonomy articles created by Polbot
Isthmian–Pacific moist forests